Kitni Girhain Baqi Hain is a Pakistani anthology television series produced by Angeline Malik which premiered on 27 March 2011 on Hum TV. The series is based on short stories on real life situations.
A second season was premiered on 30 October 2016, on the same network but with different cast.

Summary 
Kitni Girhain Baaki Hain is an anthology television series conceived, produced and directed by Angeline Malik. The series is inspired by the poetry and composition of Gulzar.
The series is based on short stories about real-life situations with a sudden twist ending.
The stories highlight the status of women in a patriarchal society. The series focuses on women's emotions across different age groups and social classes, who are bound by society's idea of them and fettered by its expectations.

Series Overview

List of Episodes

Cast
* Mehwish Hayat
 Ayeza Khan as Kaneez Fatima
 Imran Abbas as Kabir
 Urwa Hocane as Maya
 Mawra Hocane
 Sajal Aly as Recurring Character
 Danish Taimoor as Sultan
 Ayesha Omer
 Angeline Malik
 Samina Peerzada as Mother in (Wida Na Karna Maa)
 Ainy Jaffri
 Noor Hassan Rizvi
 Agha Ali
 Yumna Zaidi
 Sania Saeed as Sanam
 Sadia Ghaffar
 Javed Sheikh
 Bushra Ansari
 Javeria Abbasi
 Anoushay Abbasi
 Zuhab Khan
 Ismat Zaidi
 Aamina Sheikh as Anoushoy
 Qaiser Naqvi as Amma Gi
 Hasan Ahmed
 Saba Faisal
 Azfar Rehman as Abbas
 Maria Wasti
 Mohammed Ahmed
 Maheen Rizvi
 Saboor Aly as Aimen
 Faisal Rehman
 Farhan Ali Agha
 Syed Jibran
 Zhalay Sarhadi as Aima
 Noman Ejaz
 Azfar Rehman
 Babar Khan
 Aijaz Aslam
 Eshita Mehboob Syed in (Khushi Ke Rang)
 Badar Khalil
 Shamoon Abbasi
 Samina Ahmad
 Maira Khan
 Khalid Ahmed
 Arjumand Rahim
 Afshan Qureshi
 Lubna Aslam
 Parveen Akbar
 Saba Hameed
 Humayun Ashraf
 Shehzad Sheikh
 Farah Nadir
 Alishba Yousuf
 Arij Fatyma
 Madiha Rizvi
 Nausheen Shah
 Nida Khan
 Saleem Mairaj
 Saniya Shamshad as Kiran
 Soniya Hussain
 Sana Askari
 Taqi Ahmed
 Arisha Razi
 Sabreen Hisbani
 Faiza Hasan
 Rubina Ashraf
 Kanwar Arsalan
 Shamim Hilaly
 Adnan Siddiqui
 Suhaee Abro as Komal
 Shahood Alvi
 Sunita Marshall
 Sarah Khan as Zarmina
 Sami Khan
 Tooba Siddiqui as Ainy; Episode 3
 Ushna Shah
 Feroze Khan
 Ahmed Ali Akbar
 Anoushay Abbasi

References

Hum TV original programming
Pakistani television films
2011 Pakistani television series debuts
Urdu-language telenovelas
Pakistani telenovelas
Zee Zindagi original programming
Pakistani anthology television series